Shaun Stephen Troke (born 19 June 1978) is a British director and former actor. He first came to attention in the late 1990s after appearing as Pippin in The Adam and Joe Show.

Troke was the director of several successful low budget features, including Martyr, the teen horror film Sparrow, and the found footage film Untitled.

Troke is the executive of his own film company, Shaunywa Films.

References

External links 

Shaun Troke on Twitter

Living people
1978 births
People from Brighton
English film directors
English screenwriters
English male screenwriters
English male film actors
English film editors
English film producers
English cinematographers
English male television actors